Clarendon High School is a public high school located in Clarendon, Texas (USA) and classified as a 2A school by the UIL.  It is part of the Clarendon Independent School District located in central Donley County.  In 2015, the school was rated "Met Standard" by the Texas Education Agency.

Athletics
The Clarendon Broncos compete in these sports 

Baseball
Basketball
Cross Country
Football
Golf
Powerlifting
Softball
Tennis
Track and Field

State Titles
Boys Basketball
2021(2A), 2022(2A)

Notable alumni
Kenny King - NFL running back with the Houston Oilers and Oakland Raiders.
William S. Lott - attorney and judge in Williamson County, Texas.
Odell McBrayer - attorney and unsuccessful Republican candidate for Texas governor in 1974.
Mac Thornberry - current member of the United States House of Representatives

References

External links
Clarendon ISD

Schools in Donley County, Texas
Public high schools in Texas